Kimovsk is a town and the administrative center of Kimovsky District in Tula Oblast, Russia, located at the watershed of the Don and Volga Rivers,  southeast of Tula, the administrative center of the oblast. Population:

History
The village of Mikhaylovka has been known since the 17th century. It developed during the Great Patriotic War in connection with intensive coal exploitation at the Moscow Coal Basin. The Soviets built numerous mines on the lands of a kolkhoz called Young Communist International (abbreviated as "", or KIM) and a habitat for miners. It was granted work settlement status and given its present name in 1948; town status was granted to it in 1952.

Administrative and municipal status
Within the framework of administrative divisions, Kimovsk serves as the administrative center of Kimovsky District. As an administrative division, it is incorporated within Kimovsky District as Kimovsk Town Under District Jurisdiction. As a municipal division, Kimovsk Town Under District Jurisdiction is incorporated within Kimovsky Municipal District as Kimovsk Urban Settlement.

Transportation
Bus station and railway station share a building. Bus routes originating from Kimovsk include Moscow, Tula, Ryazan, Novomoskovsk, Uzlovaya, and other destinations.

Culture
There is a museum of local lore in Kimovsk. The Memorial of the Great Patriotic War is located on the outskirts of Karachevsky forest.

References

Sources

Notes

External links
Unofficial website of Kimovsk 
Kimovsk news portal 
Encyclopedia "My Town". Entry on Kimovsk 

Cities and towns in Tula Oblast
Cities and towns built in the Soviet Union
Populated places established in the 1940s